Britomartis igarashii  is a butterfly of the family Lycaenidae. Forewing length: 14–15 mm. It is endemic to Borneo and is distributed only in mountainous areas (Mount Kinabalu and Mount Mulu). It is a rare species. Some specimens were taken at night in light traps.

References

 Hayashi, Hisakazu, 1976: Lycaenid butterflies from Mindanao, Borneo and Sulawesi(Celebes), with the descriptions of new subspecies (Lepidoptera: Lycaenidae). Tyô to Ga. 27(3): 97-99.
 Holloway, J. D., 1984: Notes on the butterflies of the Gunung Mulu National Park. Sarawak Museum Journal. 30: 89-133.
 Seki, Yasuo, Takanami, Yusuke & Otsuka, Kazuhisa, 1991: Butterflies of Borneo, Lycaenidae. 2(1): 1-113. Toboshima Corporation, Tokyo.

Iolaini
Lepidoptera of the Philippines
Butterflies described in 1976
Endemic fauna of Borneo
Butterflies of Borneo